Fats or FATS may refer to:
 More than one type of fat, one of the three main macronutrients, along with carbohydrate and protein

People with the nickname "Fats"

 Harmonica Fats (1927–2000), American blues harmonica player who was active in the 1950s through to the 1990s
 Hollywood Fats (1954–1986), American blues guitarist, active in Los Angeles, California
 Fats Dantonio (1918–1993), American Major League Baseball catcher
 Alex Delvecchio (born 1931), Canadian hockey player
 Fats Domino (1928–2017), American rock and roll singer and pianist
 Fats Everett (1915–1969), American politician
 Peter Fatialofa (1959–2013), Samoan rugby player
 Bob Fothergill (1897–1938), American Major League Baseball player
 Fats Heard (1923–1987), American jazz drummer
 Fats Jenkins (1898–1968), American Negro leagues baseball and barnstorming basketball player
 Frank Kalin (1917–1975), American Major League Baseball outfielder
 Fats Kaplin, American fiddler
 Anthony Lacen (1950–2004), American jazz tuba player and band leader nicknamed "Tuba Fats"
 J. D. Lawrence (1903–1971), American college football player
 Fats Navarro (1923–1950), American jazz trumpeter
 Fats Pichon (1906–1967), American jazz pianist and singer
 Alvin Roth (basketball), American basketball player
 Fats Sadi (1927–2009), Belgian jazz musician
 Fats Waller (1904–1943), American jazz pianist
 Rudolf Wanderone (1913–1996), American billiards player

Other uses

 Fish acute toxicity syndrome, responses in fish resulting from a short-term, acute exposure to a lethal concentration of a toxicant
 Foreign affiliate trade statistics, data detailing the economic operations of foreign direct investment-based enterprises

 Minnesota Fats, a fictional character in the novels The Hustler and The Color of Money and the film adaptation of the former

See also

 

 Fat (disambiguation)
 Fatty (disambiguation)

Lists of people by nickname